England national cerebral palsy football team is the national cerebral football team for England that represents the team in international competitions.  The team is currently ranked 5th in the world.

Background 
The Football Association manages the national team.  The team held a national team training camp in Macau in 2007 in 2008, where their performance was tracked to assess among other things how jet lag impacted their performance.  The study found that jet lag impacted performance for the first three to four days. In October 2014, an IFCPF coaching workshop was held in Wales to try to further develop the sport, with participants from Wales, England and the Republic of Ireland. By 2016, England had a national championships to support the national team and was active in participating in the IFCPF World Championships. National team development is supported by an International Federation of Cerebral Palsy Football (IFCPF) recognized national championship.  Recognized years for the national IFCPF recognized competition include  2013, 2014, 2015, and 2016.

In 2016, after getting an endorsement by the World AntiDoping Agency (WADA), the IFCPF Anti-Doping Code was formally amended to allow for out of competition testing.  This was done through a WADA approved Whereabouts Programme managed through ADAMS. Drawing from players in a  Registered Testing Pool, players from this country were included ahead of the 2016 Summer Paralympics in Rio.

Ranking 

England are currently ranked fifth in the world by the IFCPF. Previously in August 2013, and November 2014, they were ranked tenth. In July 2011 and September 2012, England was ranked eleventh.

Results 

England has participated in a number of international tournaments.

IFCPF World Championships 
England has participated in the IFCPF World Championships.  The team trained for nine months ahead of the 2007 World Championships in Brazil.

References 

Cerebral Palsy
Great Britain at the Paralympics
National cerebral palsy football teams